Nicholas Kenan was an Irish Anglican priest in the sixteenth century: he was Bishop of Ardfert and Aghadoe from 1588 to 1599.

References

Bishops of Ardfert and Aghadoe
1599 deaths
Year of birth unknown
16th-century Irish Anglican priests